Riccardo De Santis (born 4 January 1980) is an Italian baseball player who competed in the 2004 Summer Olympics.

As a member of Italy national baseball team he won 2010 European Baseball Championship.

References

1980 births
Living people
Olympic baseball players of Italy
Baseball players at the 2004 Summer Olympics